A treasure house is a building used to store or warehouse valuable objects or artifacts. The phrase may also refer to the following:

 Treasure House (established in ~1700) in Staten Island, New York City, New York, US
 Shōsōin (established in 756) in Nara, Nara, Japan; contains hundreds of National Treasures of Japan, as well as being designated one itself
 Museum
 Treasure House (album), a 2016 album by London-based alternative rock duo Cat's Eyes